Chic is a nickname often associated with people named Charles. Notable people with this nickname include the following:

 Charles David Chic Anderson (1931–1979), American sportscaster and public address announcer specializing in horse racing
 Philip Desmond Chic Bates (born 1949), English former footballer and manager
 Robert Charles Chic Breese (1871–1929), Australian rules footballer
 Charles Thomas George Chic Brodie (footballer) (1937–2000), Scottish footballer
 Charles Gilchrist Chic Brodie (politician) (1944–2022), member of the Scottish Parliament, 2011–2016
 Chic Burlingame, nickname of Charles Burlingame (1949–2001), American pilot
 Chic Calderwood (1937–1966), Scottish boxer
 James Callaghan Chic Charnley (born 1963), Scottish footballer
 Chic Chocolate, born Antonio Xavier Vaz (1916 – May 1967), Goan trumpeter
 Henry Ciccarone (1938–1988), American college lacrosse Hall-of-Fame head coach
 Charles Chic Cicero (born 1936), American author
 Charles Chic Donovan Kelley (born 1947), American professional wrestler
 Charles Chic Geatons (1907–1970), Scottish footballer 
 Charles Wesley Chic Harley (1894–1974), American football player, member of the College Football Hall of Fame
 Mayer Jacob Chic Hecht (1928–2006), US Senator from Nevada
 Anthony Robert Chic Henry, (born 1946), Tasmanian car enthusiast
 Harold Ogden Chic Johnson (1891–1962), half of the American comedy team of Olsen and Johnson
 Cecil Chic Littlewood (1930–2015), New Zealand television entertainer and actor
 Charles Chic McLelland (born 1953), Scottish former football player and manager
 Charles Chic McSherry (born 1958),  Scottish rock guitarist, songwriter and businessman
 Charles Campbell Chic Milligan (born 1930), Scottish former footballer
 Charles Thomas McKinnon Chic Murray (1919–1985), Scottish comedian and actor
 Charles Myron Chic Murray (politician) (1914–1984), Canadian politician
 Charles "Chic" Sale (1885–1936), American actor and vaudevillian
 Charles Eber Chic Stone (1923–2000), American comic book artist
 Charlie Thomson (1930–2009), Scottish football goalkeeper
 Murat Bernard Chic Young (1901–1973), American cartoonist and creator of the comic strip Blondie

See also

Chi (surname)
Chia (surname)
Chic (disambiguation)
Chica (name)
Chick (nickname)
Chick (surname)
Chicka (disambiguation)
Chickie (nickname)
Chik (name)
Chin (surname)
Chip (name)
Chiu